Laelaspulus is a genus of mites in the family Laelapidae.

Species
 Laelaspulus acuminatus Berlese, 1903

References

Laelapidae